The  Vakhmistrov I-Ze was a parasite fighter designed in the USSR in 1934-5.

Development
To take the best advantage of parasite bomber/fighter combinations like the  Vakhmistrov Zveno project,  Vakhmistrov designed a special fighter to be carried by Kalinin VS-2 bombers. This aircraft was to have been a small low-wing monoplane powered by an  Gnome-Rhone GRKs engine. With a weight of only 1910 kg, it was expected that a top speed of 518 km/h (321 mph) would be attainable. Weight was to be kept to a minimum by the use of a centerline skid undercarriage and small dimensions:- a wingspan of 7.75m (25 ft 5in) and a wing area of only .
Construction of the prototype was started but discontinued in 1936 when support faded for the Zvyeno ("link") concept, as the supporters were eliminated in the Stalinist purges.

Specifications (I-Ze)

See also

References

 Gunston, Bill. “The Osprey Encyclopaedia of Russian Aircraft 1875 – 1995”. London, Osprey. 1995.

External links
 http://aerofiles.com/_curt.html

1930s Soviet fighter aircraft